Daniel Emil Mogoşanu (born 1 December 1967) is a Romanian football manager and former player.

Honours 

Liga I (1): 1990–91
Cupa României (2): 1990–91, 1992–93

External links 
 

1967 births
Living people
Sportspeople from Craiova
Romanian footballers
Association football defenders
Liga I players
Liga II players
CS Universitatea Craiova players
FC U Craiova 1948 players
ASC Oțelul Galați players
FC Argeș Pitești players
Romanian football managers
FC U Craiova 1948 managers
CS Universitatea Craiova managers